The 1992–93 Ball State Cardinals men's basketball team represented Ball State University as a member of the Mid-American Conference during the 1992–93 NCAA Division I men's basketball season. The team was led by head coach Dick Hunsaker and played their home games at the brand new Worthen Arena in Muncie, Indiana. Ball State finished atop the MAC regular season standings and also won the MAC tournament to receive the conference's automatic bid to the 1993 NCAA tournament. Playing as the No. 15 seed in the Midwest region, the Cardinals were beaten in the opening round by No. 2 seed and eventual Final Four participant Kansas, 94–72.

Roster

Schedule and results

|-
!colspan=9 style=| Non-conference regular season

|-
!colspan=9 style=| MAC regular season

|-
!colspan=9 style=| MAC tournament

|-
!colspan=9 style=| NCAA tournament

References

1992–93 Mid-American Conference men's basketball season
1989-90
1992 in sports in Indiana
1993 in sports in Indiana
1993 NCAA Division I men's basketball tournament participants